The Portugal national badminton team represents Portugal in international badminton team competitions. It is controlled by the Portuguese Badminton Federation, the governing body for badminton in Portugal. The Portuguese have never competed in the Thomas Cup and Uber Cup. The team last participated the Sudirman Cup in 2009.

The team have been competing in the European Men's and Women's Team Badminton Championships since 2006. They have never reached the quarterfinals.

Participation in BWF competitions

Sudirman Cup

Participation in European Team Badminton Championships

Men's Team

Women's Team

Mixed Team

Participation in Helvetia Cup 
The Helvetia Cup or European B Team Championships was a European mixed team championship in badminton. The first Helvetia Cup tournament took place in Zurich, Switzerland in 1962. The tournament took place every two years from 1971 until 2007, after which it was dissolved. Portugal once hosted the tournament in 2003. The team have been runners-up and finished in third place twice.

Participation in BWF World Senior Championships 
Former Portuguese badminton Olympians have been participating in the BWF World Senior Championships and have helped Portugal to win a medal in the championships. Telma Santos, whom previously participated in the 2016 Summer Olympics won a gold medal for Portugal in the women's singles 35+ category. Fernando Silva won four bronze medals in men's singles and mixed doubles.

List of medalists

Participation in European Junior Team Badminton Championships
Mixed Team

Current squad 
The following players were selected to represent Portugal at the 2020 European Men's and Women's Team Badminton Championships.

Male players
Bernardo Atilano
Tomas Nero
Daniel Mendes
Duarte Nuno Anjo
Bruno Carvalho
Rodrigo Almeida
Joao Chang
Tomas Coelho
Diogo Gloria
Kevin Selvarajah

Female players
Luisa Faria
Ana Reis
Adriana Goncalves
Sonia Goncalves
Ana Fernandes
Catarina Martins
Ines Pardilho
Mariana Afonso
Claudia Lourenço
Mariana Neves

References

Badminton
National badminton teams
Badminton in Portugal